Emma Handy (born 24 March 1974) is a British actress best known for her West End stage work and her role as DC Paula McIntyre in the ITV1 award-winning drama series Wire in the Blood in which she appeared for five series.

Early life 

Emma trained at the London Academy of Music and Dramatic Art (LAMDA). During the summer of her second year Emma was invited to Hungary to play the leading role in the first English translation of Csongor és Tünde by Peter Zollman at the Merlin International Theatre, Budapest.

Career 

During her final year at drama school Emma was offered the part of Yuliya in a new translation of Chekhov's The Wood Demon by Frank Dwyer at the Playhouse Theatre in London's West End.  Emma went straight onto the Royal Shakespeare Company to play Jessica in Merchant of Venice and to create the role of Rhona in the premiere of Robert Holman's Bad Weather.

Much of Emma's stage work has been involved with new writing creating many roles including Anna Van Gogh in Nicholas Wright's multi award-winning play Vincent in Brixton directed by Richard Eyre for the Royal National Theatre; Rhona in Robert Holman's Bad Weather directed by Steven Pimlott for the Royal Shakespeare Company; Lou in Murray Gold's 50 Revolutions directed by Dominic Dromgoole for the Trafalgar Studios and Cathy in Polly Teale's award-winning Speechless for Shared Experience at the Traverse Theatre, Edinburgh.

Emma played Maudie Miller in Trevor Nunn's 2011 revival of Flare Path at the Theatre Royal Haymarket marking the centenary of Terence Rattigan's birth.

In January 2013, Emma performed at the Adelaide Festival in Australia in the premiere of Thursday by the acclaimed playwright Bryony Lavery (Frozen) in a collaboration with Australian-based theatre company Brink Productions and English Touring Theatre.

Handy performed a lead role, the young Queen Elizabeth ll, 'Liz' in Moira Buffini's critically acclaimed play Handbagged examining the relationship between the Queen and prime minister Margaret Thatcher. The production toured the UK in 2015, including performances at the Theatre Royale in Bath, the Cambridge Arts Theatre, and also at the Everyman Theatre in Cheltenham. In 2016, Handy talked about playing the queen in an interview timed to coincide with the monarch's 90th birthday.

In 2021, Handy played the role of Ida in the BBC Radio 4 drama series Faith, Hope and Glory.

Filmography

Television

Film

Theatre

References

External links
 
Profile at Coastal Productions

1974 births
Alumni of the London Academy of Music and Dramatic Art
Living people
20th-century British actresses
21st-century British actresses
British film actresses
British stage actresses
British television actresses